Vinicius José Ignácio (born 25 May 1991), commonly known as Didi, is a Brazilian footballer who plays as a centre-back for Água Santa.

He has previously played for three seasons in Turkey, including a season in the Süper Lig in 2016–17, with Adanaspor.

References

External links

1991 births
Living people
People from São Vicente, São Paulo
Brazilian footballers
Brazilian expatriate footballers
Adanaspor footballers
Süper Lig players
Campeonato Brasileiro Série A players
Campeonato Brasileiro Série B players
Campeonato Brasileiro Série C players
Paulista Futebol Clube players
Sociedade Esportiva Palmeiras players
São Bernardo Futebol Clube players
Clube Recreativo e Atlético Catalano players
Grêmio Osasco Audax Esporte Clube players
Guaratinguetá Futebol players
Botafogo Futebol Clube (SP) players
Associação Ferroviária de Esportes players
Esporte Clube Juventude players
Esporte Clube Bahia players
Esporte Clube Água Santa players
Expatriate footballers in Turkey
Association football defenders
Footballers from São Paulo (state)